This list of historical markers installed by the National Historical Commission of the Philippines (NHCP) in Bangsamoro Autonomous Region in Muslim Mindanao (BARMM) is an annotated list of people, places, or events in the region that have been commemorated by cast-iron plaques issued by the said commission. The plaques themselves are permanent signs installed in publicly visible locations on buildings, monuments, or in special locations.

While many Cultural Properties have historical markers installed, not all places marked with historical markers are designated into one of the particular categories of Cultural Properties.

This article lists eighteen (18) markers from the Bangsamoro Autonomous Region in Muslim Mindanao.

Basilan
This article lists one (1) marker from the Province of Basilan.

Lanao del Sur 
This article lists one (1) marker from the Province of Lanao del Sur.

Maguindanao
This article lists seven (7) markers from the Province of Maguindanao. Markers from Cotabato City are listed here, for convenience.

Sulu
This article lists three (3) markers from the Province of Sulu.

Tawi-Tawi
This article lists five (5) markers from the Province of Tawi-Tawi.

Special Geographic Area (Cotabato)
This article lists one (1) marker from the Special Geographic Area located geographically in the province of Cotabato.

See also
List of Cultural Properties of the Philippines in Bangsamoro

References

Footnotes

Bibliography 

A list of sites and structures with historical markers, as of 16 January 2012
A list of institutions with historical markers, as of 16 January 2012

External links
A list of sites and structures with historical markers, as of 16 January 2012
A list of institutions with historical markers, as of 16 January 2012
National Registry of Historic Sites and Structures in the Philippines
Policies on the Installation of Historical Markers

History of Bangsamoro
Muslim Mindanao